Super–Vocal is a Chinese reality television created and produced by Hunan TV and iQiyi. It is a singing competition focused on classically trained singers, singing both operatic and musical pieces. It features 36 male singers, with six winners after a total of 100 days of training and filming. "Super-Vocal" Season 1 premiered on November 2, 2018, while Season 2 premiered on July 19, 2019.

Format 
Each season is filmed in a total of 100 days. During the competition, 36 male bel canto performers are challenged with different ensembles over each episode. In each episode, performers vie for the six spots as an "apprentice", but the rounds do not have elimination. The judges will train contestants during the competition based on the vocal range and their suitors on each Apprentice and Cover rounds. At the end of the 100 days, the judges will ultimately finalize a list of six performers who would be named as winners, in which they are awarded with touring and album release opportunities.

Singers were either assigned as Apprentice or Covers; an Apprentice will get to perform but Covers are assigned as backup singers.

Summary

Musical Works

Single

Live shows

Concert / Tours 
The "Super-Vocal" national tour was produced by the program team and Poly Performance. The first performance was kicked off at Beijing Poly Theater on April 16, 2019, and closed in Shanghai on June 2. This tour had a total of 17 shows, besides attending the Chengdu Music Festival and Poly ART Music Festival. The "Never Say Goodbye" non-profit tour was led by Yu Di and fellow cast members, without the involvement of "Super-Vocal" program. The same titled national tour of the second season of the concert kicked off on December 2, 2019 at the Changsha Grand Theater of the Meixi Lake International Cultural Center, and ended on January 14, 2020 in Beijing. There were 11 shows on this tour.

Result Competing in "Singer 2019" 
On January 26, 2019, the "Singer 2019" program announced on Weibo that the "Super-Vocal Boys" consisting of A Yunga , Zheng Yunlong , Ju Hongchuan and Cai Chengyu would become the second group to be a challenger on the show. The group competed with singer Qian Zhenghao in the second round in hope for competing in the kick-off round. He defeated Qian Zhenghao with "Deer Be Free", which had previously sung by A Yunga and Cai Chengyu in the fourth season, and was officially qualified for the knock-off round. In the next official kick-off round, they sang Loren Allred 's "Never Enough" and won the third place. On March 12, Zheng Yunlong issued a statement on his personal Weibo saying that he would no longer participate in the fourth round of knockouts and subsequent competitions due to conflicting schedules. The "Super-Vocal Boys" continued to participate in the remaining season with three members. In the end, the group successfully advanced to the finals and won the third place.

"Choir! 300" Competition Results 
On August 11, 2019, the "Super-Vocal Choir" by Ju Hongchuan , Cai Chengyu and Zhang Chao participated in the filming of "Choir! 300" season three, broadcast on Tencent Video. During the un-rehearsal section, they sang "Heart of Light" with the fans. The Super–Vocal Choir lost to the Rocket Girl 101 Choir by 0.96 points, unfortunately eliminated before the final round. In the sixth episode which was aired on September 1, the Super–Vocal Choir gave back to the fans with a song "Never Say Goodbye".

Ratings

First season

Second season

Awards

References

Chinese music television series
Variety shows
Singing competitions